The Call Girls is a 1977 Hong Kong film produced by the Shaw Brothers Studio.

The film was a top ten box office hit in 1977 in Hong Kong.

Cast
 Chen Ping
 Danny Lee
 Shirley Yu
 Si Wai
 Chan Shen
 Cheng Miu
 Ha Ping
 Chiang Nan
 Lam Fai Wong
 Wong Jing Jing

See also
 Prostitution in Hong Kong

References

External links
 IMDb entry

Hong Kong drama films
Shaw Brothers Studio films
1977 films
1970s Hong Kong films